Miss Venezuela 1977 was the 24th edition of Miss Venezuela pageant held at Teatro Paris (now called Teatro La Campiña) in Caracas, Venezuela, on May 6, 1977. The winner of the pageant was Cristal Montañez, Miss Departamento Vargas.

The pageant was broadcast live by Venevision.

Results
Miss Venezuela 1977 - Cristal Montañez (Miss Departamento Vargas)
1st runner-up - Vilma Góliz Romero (Miss Falcón) (disqualified)
1st runner-up - Jackeline Van Den Branden (Miss Distrito Federal)
2nd runner-up - Betty Paredes (Miss Lara)
3rd runner-up - Adriana Zekendorf (Miss Barinas)
4th runner-up - Isbelia Belloso (Miss Zulia) (entered runners-up after disqualification of Miss Falcón)

Special awards
 Miss Fotogénica (Miss Photogenic) - Vilma Góliz (Miss Falcón)
 Miss Elegancia (Miss Elegance) - Cristal Montañez (Miss Departamento Vargas)
 Miss Simpatía (Miss Congeniality) - Adriana Zekendorf (Miss Barinas)
 Miss Amistad (Miss Friendship) - Ana Celina Pabón (Miss Táchira)

Delegates

 Miss Anzoátegui - Consuelo Emperatriz Vegas
 Miss Apure - Emilia González
 Miss Aragua - Enriqueta Coll
 Miss Barinas - Adriana Zekendorf Gómez
 Miss Carabobo - Rita D'Elia
 Miss Departamento Vargas - Cristal Montañez Arocha
 Miss Distrito Federal - Jackeline Van Den Branden Oquendo
 Miss Falcón - Vilma Yadira Góliz Romero
 Miss Guárico - Finita Arreaza
 Miss Lara - Betty Paredes
 Miss Mérida - Silvia Schanelly
 Miss Miranda - Betty González
 Miss Táchira - Ana Celina Pabón Ramírez
 Miss Trujillo - Luisa del Carmen -Reina- Morón Piña
 Miss Zulia - Isbelia Belloso Leyba

External links
Miss Venezuela official website

1977 beauty pageants
1977 in Venezuela